Dominic Stephan Stricker (born 16 August 2002) is a Swiss tennis player. He has a career high ATP singles ranking of No. 111 achieved on 7 November 2022. He also has a career high ATP doubles ranking of No. 161 achieved on 27 June 2022. On the junior tour, he had a career high junior ranking of No. 8, achieved on 3 February 2020.

Junior career
Stricker won the 2020 French Open boys' singles title, defeating compatriot Leandro Riedi in the final. He also won the 2020 French Open boys' doubles title, partnering Flavio Cobolli.

Professional career

2021: Maiden ATP doubles title, ATP & Top 250 debut in singles, Top 200 in doubles
In March, ranked No. 874 in the world, he received a wild card entry into the 2021 BSI Challenger Lugano, Switzerland. He won the tournament, defeating Vitaliy Sachko in straight sets in the final. He became the 3rd youngest Swiss player after Roger Federer and Stan Wawrinka to win an ATP Challenger title. Following this successful run, he made his top 500 debut in singles.

In May, Stricker made his ATP debut at the 2021 Geneva Open as a wildcard where he beat former US Open champion and former ATP ranked number 3 Marin Čilić in the first round for his first ATP victory. He then defeated Márton Fucsovics to reach his first ATP tour level quarterfinal. He reached a career-high of World No. 334 in singles on 24 May 2021.

In June at the 2021 MercedesCup in Stuttgart he reached again the quarterfinals where he defeated second seed Hubert Hurkacz for his first top-20 win of the season. As a result, he moved into the top 300 at No. 289 on 14 June 2021.

In July, partnering again with Vitaliy Sachko, he won his maiden Challenger doubles title at the 2021 Internazionali di Tennis Città di Perugia  defeating Argentines Tomás Martín Etcheverry/Renzo Olivo. He reached a career-high of No. 280 in singles and No. 371 in doubles on 12 July 2021.

He won his maiden ATP doubles title at the 2021 Swiss Open Gstaad, partnering Marc-Andrea Hüsler, defeating Polish pair Szymon Walków and Jan Zielinski.

In September, partnering also Marc-Andrea Hüsler, he reached the final of the 2021 Challenger Biel/Bienne, Switzerland but withdrew. As a result, he reached a new career-high doubles ranking of World No. 196 on 27 September 2021. He also reached the semifinals in singles, resulting in a new career-high singles ranking of World No. 269 on 4 October 2021.

2022: Top 125 debut in singles
He reached the top 200 at World No. 164 on 7 February 2022 after winning his second ATP Challenger title at the 2022 Cleveland Open. 
After reaching his third Challenger final and second title of the season at the 2022 Zug Open in Switzerland, he moved into the top 150.

In October, at the 2022 European Open in Antwerp, he defeated seventh seed Botic van de Zandschulp in straight sets in the first round as a qualifier.
The following week, at the 2022 Swiss Indoors, he also reached the second round as a wildcard defeating Maxime Cressy improving his chances to qualify for the 2022 Next Generation ATP Finals. He qualified for the NextGen Finals on 27 October 2022 and reached the semifinals undefeated beating top seed Lorenzo Musetti en route in a five set thriller lasting close to two hours and a half.

2023
At the 2023 Australian Open he reached the third round of qualifying.

Singles performance timeline

Current through the 2022 Davis Cup.

ATP career finals

Doubles: 1 (1 title)

ATP Challenger and ITF Futures finals

Singles: 5 (4–1)

Doubles: 5 (2–3)

Junior Grand Slam finals

Singles: 1 (1 title)

Doubles: 2 (1 title, 1 runner-up)

Record against top 10 players
Stricker's record against players who have been ranked in the top 10, with those who are active in boldface. Only ATP Tour main draw matches are considered:

References

External links
 
 

2002 births
Living people
Swiss male tennis players
French Open junior champions
Grand Slam (tennis) champions in boys' singles
Grand Slam (tennis) champions in boys' doubles
21st-century Swiss people